David "Dai" Thomas (birth unknown – death unknown) was a Welsh professional rugby league footballer who played in the 1900s.

Playing career

International honours
Thomas won caps for Wales while at Halifax in 1908 against England (3 matches), and represented Welsh League XIII while at Merthyr Tydfil in the 14–13 victory over Australia at Penydarren Park, Merthyr Tydfil on Tuesday 19 January 1909.

Club career
Thomas played for Dewsbury and Halifax at club level. He holds Dewsbury's "Tries In A Season" record with 40-tries scored in the 1906–07 season, and Dewsbury's "Tries In A Match" record with 8-tries against Liverpool City on 13 April 1907.

References

Notes

Aberdare RLFC players
Dewsbury Rams players
Halifax R.L.F.C. players
Place of birth missing
Place of death missing
Rugby league wingers
Wales national rugby league team players
Welsh League rugby league team players
Welsh rugby league players
Year of birth missing
Year of death missing